is a Japanese anime storyboard artist and director.

Filmography
Ai no Wakakusa Monogatari 2: Director
Bomberman Bidaman Bakugaiden: Series director
Cardcaptor Sakura: Storyboard and episode director
Don't Hurt Me, My Healer!: Director
Duel Masters (movie): Unit director
Kaikan Phrase: Storyboard and episode director
Kashimashi: Girl Meets Girl: Director, storyboard, episode director
Koihime Musō: Director
Lucifer and the Biscuit Hammer: Director
Magical Circle Guru Guru: Director, storyboard
Mangirl!: Director
Sumomomo Momomo: Director
The Bush Baby: Storyboard, Episode director
The Daichis - Earth Defence Family: Episode director

References

External links
 

Anime directors
Living people
Year of birth missing (living people)